Touched by a Polka is an album by Jimmy Sturr, released through Rounder Records on August 15, 2000. In 2001, the album won Sturr the Grammy Award for Best Polka Album.

Track listing
 "Tic Toc" – 3:13
 "If You've Got the Money (I've Got the Time)" (Jim Beck, Lefty Frizzell) – 2:10
 "Melody" (Sturr) – 2:53
 "St. Patty's Polka Melody" – 4:00
 "If I Could Catch a Rainbow" (Sturr, Will) – 2:08
 "San Antonio Rose" (Bob Wills) – 3:14
 "Don't Cry Daddy" (Wojnarowski) – 3:08
 "Little Girl of Mine" (Corcoran) – 3:30
 "Thibodeaux and His Cajun Band" (Newman) – 2:07
 "Time Changes Everything" (Tommy Duncan) – 2:24

Personnel

 Doyle Brown – visual coordinator
 Dennis Coyman – drums
 Wally Czerniawski – accordion
 Ray DeBrown – arranger
 Nick Devito – clarinet, alto saxophone
 Mel Ellis – performer
 Geoffrey Himes – liner notes
 Doug Howard – engineer
 Ken Irwin – mixing engineer
 The Jordanaires – backing vocals
 Johnny Karas – tenor saxophone, vocals

 Dr. Toby Mountain – mastering
 Al Noble – trumpet
 Dermot O'Brien – vocals
 Eric Parks – trumpet
 Tom Pick – producer, engineer, mixing engineer
 Keith Slattery – piano
 Jimmy Sturr – arranger, producer, mixing engineer
 Mel Tillis – vocals
 Frank Urbanovitch – fiddle, vocals
 Henry Will – arranger

See also
 Polka in the United States

References

2000 albums
Grammy Award for Best Polka Album
Jimmy Sturr albums
Rounder Records albums